The Vermont Department for Children and Families (DCF) is a state agency of Vermont, headquartered in the Waterbury Office Complex in Waterbury.

The department was formed on July 1, 2004.

Divisions 
The divisions of DCF are as follows:

 Child Development Division
 Disability Determination Services
 Economic Services Division
 Family Services Division
 Office of Child Support
 Office of Economic Opportunity

DCF operates the Woodside Juvenile Rehabilitation Center, used for short-term placement and long-term treatment of juvenile delinquents. It is Vermont's sole locked juvenile facility. The detention program can serve up to 16 boys and girls, and the treatment program can serve up to 12 boys. Woodside is located in Colchester.

Investigation
In 2010, the IRS began investigating a former DCF employee from Newport who was accused of embezzling $490,000 using 250 checks, from August 2004 until October 2009. The technical charge was failure to report income and pay income tax. She was found guilty in 2011, imprisoned and ordered to make restitution.

References

External links
 Vermont Department for Children and Families

State agencies of Vermont
Juvenile detention centers in the United States
State corrections departments of the United States
2004 establishments in Vermont
Government agencies established in 2004